Castro Marim and Vila Real de Santo António Marsh Nature Reserve (Portuguese: Reserva Natural do Sapal de Castro Marim e Vila Real de Santo António) is a nature reserve in Portugal. It is a Ramsar wetland. It attracts visitors due to its diverse fauna, which comprises some 153 species of birds, including storks, avocets, sandpipers and flocks of flamingos, as well as more than 400 plant species and various reptiles, amphibians and mammals. In the Spring of 2021, 550 flamingos were born at the natural reserve - a first for Portugal.

References

Castro Marim
Nature reserves in Portugal
Vila Real de Santo António
Ramsar sites in Portugal
Natura 2000 in Portugal